Lunca de Jos (: , colloquially Középlok) is a commune in Harghita County, Transylvania, Romania. It lies in the ethno-cultural region Szekely land.

Component villages 
The commune is composed of nine villages:

History 

The village was historically part of the Székely Land region of Transylvania province. The first reports of settlers in the area was from 1721. It became independent from Gyimesbükk in 1795. The birth registry starts from 1854. The village belonged to Csíkszék district until the administrative reform of Transylvania in 1876, when they fell within the Csík County in the Kingdom of Hungary. After the Treaty of Trianon of 1920, they became part of Romania and fell within Ciuc County during the interwar period. In 1940, the second Vienna Award granted the Northern Transylvania to Hungary and the villages were held by Hungary until 1944. After Soviet occupation, the Romanian administration returned and the commune became officially part of Romania in 1947. Between 1952 and 1960, the commune fell within the Magyar Autonomous Region, between 1960 and 1968 the Mureș-Magyar Autonomous Region. In 1968, the province was abolished, and since then, the commune has been part of Harghita County.

Demographics
At the 2011 census, the commune had a population of 5,328; out of them, 98% were Hungarian and 0.7% were Romanian.

Economy 
Until 1989, it was the center of local timber manufacturing with a board and since 1976 a furniture factory. The main activity of the villagers is cattle herding  and potato production. Industrial activity has decreased significantly after 1990.

References

External links 
Voluntary Firefighter Association
Gyimes Folk Dance Camp
Tourist accommodation 
Tourist accommodation 
Pictures of the village

Communes in Harghita County
Localities in Transylvania
Székely communities
Csángó communities